Johanna MG (Joke) Brandt, internationally she also uses the name Yoka Brandt, is a Dutch diplomat, administrator, and civil servant. In 2020 Brandt is the permanent representative to the United Nations in New York. She served as Ambassador of the Netherlands to Eritrea from 2000 to 2004.

Career
Joke Brandt studied geography and development at Utrecht University. She worked as a civil servant at the Ministry of Foreign Affairs (including some time at the embassy in South Africa )  before being posted as ambassador to Eritrea (2000-2004) and Uganda (2004-2007).

She then returned to The Hague to become Deputy Director General and a year later Director General for International Cooperation at the same ministry's deputy director UNICEF in New York, until she was named in 2016 to succeed Renee Jones-Bos as secretary general.

References

Living people
Ambassadors
Civil servants
Dutch women diplomats
Dutch women ambassadors
1958 births